Vincent Louis Gigante (March 28, 1928 – December 19, 2005), also known as "The Chin", was an American mobster who was boss of the Genovese crime family in New York City from 1981 to 2005. Gigante started out as a professional boxer who fought in 25 matches between 1944 and 1947. He then started working as a Mafia enforcer for what was then the Luciano crime family, forerunner of the Genovese family. Gigante was one of five brothers; three of them, Mario, Pasquale, and Ralph, followed him into the Mafia. Only one brother, Louis, stayed out of the crime family, instead becoming a Catholic priest. Gigante was the shooter in the failed assassination of longtime Luciano boss Frank Costello in 1957. In 1959, he was sentenced to seven years in prison for drug trafficking, and after sharing a prison cell with Costello's rival, Vito Genovese, Gigante became a caporegime overseeing his own crew of Genovese soldiers and associates who operated out of Greenwich Village.

Gigante quickly rose to power during the 1960s and 1970s. By 1981 he became the family's boss, while Anthony "Fat Tony" Salerno served as front boss during the first half of the 1980s. He also ordered the failed murder attempt of Gambino crime family boss John Gotti in 1986. With the arrest and conviction of Gotti and various Gambino family members in 1992, Gigante was recognized as the most powerful crime boss in the United States. For about 30 years, Gigante feigned insanity in an effort to throw law enforcement off his trail. Dubbed "The Oddfather" and "The Enigma in the Bathrobe" by the media, Gigante often wandered the streets of Greenwich Village in his bathrobe and slippers, mumbling incoherently to himself. He was indicted on federal racketeering charges in 1990, but was determined to be mentally unfit to stand trial. In 1997, he was tried and convicted of racketeering and conspiracy, and sentenced to 12 years in prison. Facing obstruction of justice charges in 2003, he pleaded guilty and admitted that his supposed insanity was an elaborate effort to avoid prosecution, as he was sentenced to an additional three years in prison. He died while incarcerated at the United States Medical Center for Federal Prisoners on December 19, 2005.

Early life and boxing career 
Gigante was born in New York City to Italian immigrants from Naples, Salvatore Gigante, a watchmaker, and Yolanda Gigante (née Scotto), a seamstress. He had four brothers, Mario, Pasquale, and Ralph, who followed him into a life of organized crime, and Louis, who became a Catholic priest at St. Athanasius Church in the South Bronx and city councilman. According to his brother Louis, his nickname, "The Chin", stemmed from their mother affectionately calling him Chinzeeno as a boy, derived from the name Vincenzo, the Italian form of Vincent. Gigante graduated from Public School 3 in West Village, Manhattan and later attended Textile High School, but dropped out.

Gigante was a professional light heavyweight boxer between 1944 and 1947, who was known as "The Chin" Gigante. He fought 25 matches and lost four, boxing 117 rounds. His first professional boxing match was against Vic Chambers on July 18, 1944, in Union City, New Jersey, which he lost; he then fought Chambers a second time at the St. Nicholas Arena on October 6, 1944, and defeated him. He defeated him again on June 29, 1945, at Madison Square Garden. His last match was against Jimmy Slade on May 17, 1947, at Ridgewood Grove, Brooklyn, which he lost by technical knockout.

He maintained a residence in Old Tappan, New Jersey, with his wife Olympia Grippa, whom he married in 1950, and their five children, Andrew, Salvatore, Yolanda, Roseanne, and Rita. He maintained his second family at a townhouse in the Upper East Side, Manhattan with his longtime mistress and common-law wife, Olympia Esposito and their three children, Vincent, Lucia and Carmella. He often stayed at his mother's apartment in Greenwich Village.

Criminal career

Costello murder attempt and caporegime 

As a teenager, Gigante became the protégé of future Genovese crime family patriarch Vito Genovese, who had helped pay for Gigante's mother's surgery. Between the ages of 17 and 25, he was arrested seven times on charges ranging from receiving stolen goods, possession of an unlicensed handgun, and illegal gambling and bookmaking. Most were dismissed or resolved by fines, except for a 60-day jail-stay for a gambling conviction; during this time, Gigante listed his occupation as a tailor.

In early 1957, Genovese decided to move on Luciano family boss Frank Costello. Genovese ordered Gigante to murder Costello, and on May 2, 1957, Gigante shot and wounded Costello outside his apartment building. Although the wound was superficial, it persuaded Costello to relinquish power to Genovese and retire. Genovese then controlled what is now called the Genovese crime family. A doorman identified Gigante as the gunman. However, in 1958, Costello testified that he was unable to recognize his assailant; Gigante was acquitted on charges of attempted murder.

In 1959, Gigante was convicted, with Vito Genovese, of heroin trafficking and sentenced to seven years in prison; he was paroled after five years. Not long afterward, he was promoted from soldier to captain, running the Greenwich Village Crew, and headquartered at the Triangle Civic Improvement Association.

In 1969, Gigante was indicted in New Jersey for conspiracy to bribe the entire five-member Old Tappan, New Jersey police force to alert him to surveillance operations by law enforcement agencies, although that charge was dropped after Gigante's lawyers presented reports from psychiatrists that he was mentally unfit to stand trial.

Since 1969, Gigante had been treated 20 times for psychiatric disorders, and Gigante's "primary treating psychiatrist", Eugene D'Adamo, noted: 

Gigante's lawyers and relatives said that Gigante had been mentally disabled since the late 1960s, with a below-normal IQ of 69 to 72.

Genovese crime boss 
In 1981, Genovese's successor, Philip "Benny Squint" Lombardo, stepped down as boss due to poor health. With Lombardo's support, Gigante became boss of the Genovese family. Anthony "Fat Tony" Salerno was made front boss of the Genovese family in order to fool law enforcement.

Gigante built a vast network of bookmaking and loansharking rings and from extortions of garbage, shipping, trucking and construction companies seeking labor peace or contracts from carpenters', Teamsters and laborers' unions, including those at the Javits Center, as well as protection payoffs from merchants at the Fulton Fish Market. Gigante also had influence in the Feast of San Gennaro in Little Italy, operating gambling games, extorting payoffs from vendors, and pocketing thousands of dollars donated to a neighborhood church—until a crackdown in 1995 by New York City officials.

On April 13, 1986, Gambino crime family underboss Frank DeCicco was killed when his car was bombed following a visit to Paul Castellano loyalist James Failla. The bombing was carried out by Victor Amuso and Anthony Casso of the Lucchese crime family, under orders of Gigante and Lucchese boss Anthony Corallo, to avenge Castellano and Thomas Bilotti by killing their successors; John Gotti also planned to visit Failla that day, but canceled, and the bomb was detonated after a soldier who rode with DeCicco was mistaken for the boss.

In January 1987, Salerno was sentenced to 100 years in prison for racketeering, along with top members of the other New York families, as part of the Mafia Commission Trial. Salerno had initially been billed as the boss of the Genovese family. However, shortly after the trial, Salerno's longtime right-hand man, Vincent "The Fish" Cafaro, turned informant and told the FBI that Salerno had been a front for the real boss, Gigante. Cafaro also revealed that the Genovese family had been keeping up this ruse since 1969. FBI bugs had captured a conversation in which Salerno and capo Matthew "Matty the Horse" Ianniello were reviewing a list of prospective candidates to be made in another family. Frustrated that the nicknames of the wannabes had not been included, Salerno shrugged and said, "I'll leave this up to the boss."

Gigante was reclusive, and almost impossible to capture on wiretaps, speaking softly, eschewing the phone and even at times whistling into the receiver. He almost never left his home unoccupied because he knew FBI agents would sneak in and plant a bug. Genovese members were not allowed to mention Gigante's name in conversations or phone calls; when they had to mention him, members pointed to their chins or made the letter "C" with their fingers.

During Gigante's tenure as boss of the Genovese family, after the imprisonment of John Gotti in 1992, Gigante came to be known as the figurehead capo di tutti capi, the "Boss of All Bosses", despite the position being abolished in 1931 with the murder of Salvatore Maranzano.

Trials and conviction 

From 1978 to 1990, four of the five crime families of New York, including the Genovese family, rigged bids for 75 percent of $191 million, or about $142 million, of the window contracts awarded by the New York City Housing Authority. Installation companies were required to make union payoffs between $1 and $2 for each windows installed.

In 1988, Gigante had open-heart surgery. On May 30, 1990, Gigante was indicted along with other members of four of the New York crime families for conspiring to rig bids and extort payoffs from contractors on multimillion-dollar contracts with the New York City Housing Authority to install windows. Gigante attended his arraignment in pajamas and bathrobe, and due to his defense stating that he was mentally and physically impaired, legal battles ensued for seven years over his competence to stand trial.

In June 1993, Gigante was under indictment again, charged with sanctioning the murders of six mobsters and conspiring to kill three others, including Gambino boss John Gotti. At sanity hearings in March 1996, Sammy "The Bull" Gravano, former underboss of the Gambino crime family, who became a cooperating witness in 1991, and Alphonse "Little Al" D'Arco, former acting boss of the Lucchese family, testified that Gigante was lucid at top-level Mafia meetings and that he had told other gangsters that his eccentric behavior was a pretense. Gigante's lawyers got testimony and reports from psychiatrists that from 1969 to 1995 Gigante had been confined 28 times in hospitals for treatment of hallucinations and that he suffered from "dementia rooted in organic brain damage".

In August 1996, senior judge of the United States District Court for the Eastern District of New York, Eugene Nickerson, ruled that Gigante was mentally competent to stand trial; he pleaded not guilty and had been free for years on $1 million bail. Gigante had another cardiac operation in December 1996. On June 25, 1997, Gigante's trial started; Gigante stood trial in a wheelchair. On July 25, 1997, after almost three days of deliberations, the jury convicted Gigante of conspiring in plots to kill other mobsters and of running rackets as head of the Genovese family. Prosecutors stated that the verdict finally established that Gigante was not mentally ill as his lawyers and relatives had long maintained.

On December 18, 1997, Gigante was sentenced to 12 years in prison and fined $1.25 million by judge Jack B. Weinstein, a lenient sentence due to Gigante's "age and frailty", who declared that Gigante had been "... finally brought to bay in his declining years after decades of vicious criminal tyranny". While in prison, he maintained his role as boss of the Genovese family, while other mobsters were entrusted to run the day-to-day activities of the family; Gigante relayed orders to the crime family through his son, Andrew, who visited him in prison.

On January 23, 2002, Gigante was indicted with several other mobsters, including his son Andrew, on racketeering and obstruction of justice charges. Prosecutors accused him of continuing to rule his family from prison, and that he used Andrew to funnel messages to the family. They also wanted him held responsible for causing a seven-year delay in his previous trial by feigning insanity. Several days later, Andrew was released on $2.5 million bail. Federal prosecutor Roslynn R. Mauskopf had planned to play tapes showing him "fully coherent, careful and intelligent," running crime operations from prison. Faced with this evidence, Gigante pleaded guilty to obstruction of justice on April 7, 2003; just hours before the trial was to start. Judge I. Leo Glasser sentenced him to an additional three years in prison. Mauskopf stated, "The jig is up ... Vincent Gigante was a cunning faker, and those of us in law enforcement always knew that this was an act ... The act ran for decades, but today it's over."

On July 25, 2003, Gigante's son Andrew was sentenced to two years in prison and fined $2.5 million for racketeering and extortion. The New York Times organized-crime reporter and mob historian Selwyn Raab described Gigante's plea deal as an "unprecedented capitulation" for a Mafia boss; it was almost unheard of for a boss to even consider pleading guilty. However, Gigante agreed to the deal to ease the burden on his relatives. For instance, Andrew faced up to 20 years in prison had he gone to trial.  Another provision of the plea agreement stipulated that any relatives who helped in his deception—including his wife, mistress and Father Louis—would not be charged with obstruction of justice.

Death 
Gigante died on December 19, 2005, at the Medical Center for Federal Prisoners in Springfield, Missouri. His funeral and burial were held four days later, on December 23, at Saint Anthony of Padua Church in Greenwich Village, largely in anonymity.

Since Gigante's death, his family has continued to live well. According to a 2011 report by Jerry Capeci, Gigante's relatives earn nearly $2 million a year as employees of companies on the New Jersey waterfront.

In popular culture

Films and television 
 He is portrayed by Nicholas Kepros in the 1998 TV film Witness to the Mob.
 The Law & Order episode "Faccia e Faccia", first aired February 28, 1998, featured an aging mafia don claiming mental impairment, inspired by Gigante.
 In the 2018 film Gotti, Gigante is portrayed by Sal Rendino.
 Gigante is portrayed in the 2019 film Mob Town by Nick Cordero. This would be Nick Cordero's final movie role before his death on July 5, 2020. 
 He is portrayed by Vincent D'Onofrio in the 2019 TV series Godfather of Harlem.
 Gigante is portrayed by Tony Amendola in the 2022 TV miniseries Black Bird.

Documentaries 
The story of the FBI investigation into Gigante was depicted in season 1, episode 7 of The FBI Files documentary show, titled "The Crazy Don" (which first aired on December 8, 1998).
National Geographic aired a six-part documentary series, Inside the American Mob, where Gigante features prominently in episode 5, "The Rise and Fall of Gotti", while actions attributed to him are discussed in episode 3, "New York–Philly War".

References

Further reading 
Capeci, Jerry. The Complete Idiot's Guide to the Mafia. Indianapolis: Alpha Books, 2002. 
Jacobs, James B., Coleen Friel and Robert Radick. Gotham Unbound: How New York City Was Liberated from the Grip of Organized Crime. New York: NYU Press, 2001. 
Maas, Peter. Underboss: Sammy the Bull Gravano's Story of Life in the Mafia. New York: HarperCollins Publishers, 1997. 
Raab, Selwyn. Five Families: The Rise, Decline, and Resurgence of America's Most Powerful Mafia Empires. New York: St. Martin Press, 2005.

External links 

 Vincent Gigante Mafia Archive
 
 nytimes.com
 ssdi.rootsweb.ancestry.com

1928 births
2005 deaths
Light-heavyweight boxers
People from the Lower East Side
American gangsters of Italian descent
American people of Italian descent
Bosses of the Genovese crime family
Capo dei capi
Genovese crime family
People convicted of racketeering
American people who died in prison custody
Prisoners who died in United States federal government detention
People from Greenwich Village
People from Old Tappan, New Jersey
American drug traffickers
American people convicted of drug offenses
People convicted of obstruction of justice
People acquitted of murder
American male boxers